Weaverham is a civil parish in Cheshire West and Chester, England.  Apart from the village of Weaverham, the parish is entirely rural, and contains 22 buildings that are recorded in the National Heritage List for England as designated listed buildings.  Most of the buildings are related to houses or farming, and many of the cottages originating in the 17th century are basically timber-framed.  Buildings in other categories are two churches, a public house, and the former grammar school.

In 2009, Weaverham History Society, in association with The Weaverham Trust and Vale Royal Borough Council, installed 15 blue plaques on listed properties around the village, creating a  heritage walk described on a leaflet and on interpretation boards within the village.

Key

Buildings

References
Citations

Sources

Listed buildings in Cheshire West and Chester
Lists of listed buildings in Cheshire